Local government in Greater London takes place in two tiers; an upper tier and a lower tier. The upper tier authority is the Greater London Authority (GLA), controlled by the Mayor of London and the London Assembly. The lower tier authorities are the 32 borough councils and the City of London Corporation in the City of London.

Upper tier

The Greater London Authority consists of two elected parts. They are the Mayor of London, who has executive powers, and the London Assembly, who scrutinise the Mayor's decisions and can accept or reject his budget proposals each year. The GLA is responsible for strategic planning, policing, the fire service, most aspects of transport and economic development. It is a recent organisation, having been set up in 2000 to replace the similar Greater London Council (GLC) which had been abolished in 1986. The headquarters of the GLA and the Mayor of London is at City Hall. The current Mayor of London is Sadiq Khan who was elected in 2016, replacing Boris Johnson, who served two terms.

Health services in London are managed by the national government through the National Health Service, which is controlled and administered in London by a single strategic health authority called NHS London.

Timeline for leaders of London-wide government
Timeline

Lower tier

The 33 local authorities are the 32 London borough councils and the City of London Corporation. They are responsible for local services not overseen by the GLA, such as local planning, schools, social services, local roads and refuse collection. The London boroughs each have a council made up from representatives from political parties and single issue organisations elected every four years by local residents

The City of London does not have a conventional local authority, but is governed by the historic City of London Corporation which is elected by both residents and businesses, and which has existed more or less unchanged since the Middle Ages. The head of the Corporation is the Lord Mayor of the City of London, which is a different position from that of Mayor of London. The City of London also has its own police force: The City of London Police, which is independent of the Metropolitan Police Service which covers the rest of Greater London. Within the City of London are two liberties, the Inner Temple and the Middle Temple, which are local authorities for most purposes to the present day.

 City of London
 City of Westminster
 Kensington and Chelsea
 Hammersmith and Fulham
 Wandsworth
 Lambeth
 Southwark
 Tower Hamlets
 Hackney
 Islington
 Camden
 Brent
 Ealing
 Hounslow
 Richmond
 Kingston
 Merton
 Sutton
 Croydon
 Bromley
 Lewisham
 Greenwich
 Bexley
 Havering
 Barking and Dagenham
 Redbridge
 Newham
 Waltham Forest
 Haringey
 Enfield
 Barnet
 Harrow
 Hillingdon

Civil parishes
The Local Government and Public Involvement in Health Act 2007 allowed the creation of civil parishes (and parish councils) within London boroughs, if local residents request their creation through a petition. Prior to this, civil parishes were not permitted within Greater London. However, only one civil parish has been created within London at Queen's Park in 2014. The vast majority of London is unparished.

References